The High Qing era refers to the golden age between 1683 and 1799 during the Qing dynasty of China during which the empire's prosperity and power grew to new heights. Set after the rule of the Ming dynasty, the High Qing saw China transform into a commercial state with nearly twice the population of its predecessor, due to high political stability. Improvements in literacy also took place during this period, and China's territory greatly expanded north and west compared to the previous Ming dynasty.

The period is also sometimes called Kang Yong Qian Shengshi (康雍乾盛世) or the "Prosperous Age of Kangxi, Yongzheng, and Qianlong". It is abbreviated to Kang Qian as the Yongzheng Emperor had a much shorter reign than the Kangxi Emperor and the Qianlong Emperor.

Characteristics of the High Qing 

Firstly, these emperors combined the strengths of their culture in addition to a level of sinicization of the conquered cultures in order to combine assimilation and the retaining of their own cultural identity. The Kangxi Emperor initiated the High Qing. As an emperor he elevated the empire through his passion for education in combination with his military expertise, and his restructuring of the bureaucracy into that of a cosmopolitan one. Under Kangxi, China also compiled expansive works of literature, encyclopedias, and dictionaries such as the Kangxi Dictionary and Gujin Tushu Jicheng. His son and successor, the Yongzheng Emperor had the shortest reign compared to Kangxi and Qianlong. Yongzheng also ruled differently through more harsh and brutal tactics, but was also efficient and committed to the maintenance of the empire. 

The last successful emperor of the High Qing was the Qianlong Emperor who, following in the footsteps of his father and grandfather, was a well-rounded ruler who created the peak of the High Qing empire. During Qianlong's reign, the Qing empire expanded to its furthest extent and saw the creation of more classic works of literature such as the Dream of the Red Chamber and Siku Quanshu. The unique and unprecedented ruling techniques of these emperors, and the emphasis on multiculturalism fostered the productivity and success that is the High Qing era.

Population growth 
The economic base and living standards of Qing China experienced a stark improvement during the 18th century, driven by increases in both agricultural output and trade volumes, it saw a tripling of its population. Growth in population not only exceeded the Ming period but eventually surpassed it due to long periods of peace and economic prosperity with the growth of commerce.

Territorial expansion 

The Qing empire was much larger in population and territory than the previous Ming dynasty. Additionally, the conquest of the western territories of the Mongols, Tibetans, and Muslims under the rule of the Qing were another factor of prosperity. Again, the skillful rule of the era’s emperors allowed for this success. Rule through chiefdoms in territories like Taiwan, allowed for the conquered peoples to retain their culture and be ruled by their own people while the Qing Empire still possessed the ultimate control and rule. These ruling tactics created little need or reason for rebellion of the conquered. Another aspect of Manchu rule under the Qing Empire was rule within modern day China. The Mongols' attempt to rule may have failed because they attempted to rule from the outside.  The High Qing emperors ruled from within, enabling them to obtain and retain stable and efficient control of the state.

Commercial expansion 
A heavy revival of the arts was another characteristic of the High Qing Empire. Through commercialization, items such as porcelain were mass produced and used in trade. Also, literature was emphasized as Imperial libraries were erected, and literacy rates of men and women both rose  within the elite class. The significance of education and art in this era is that it created economic stimulation that would last for a period of over fifty years.

Literacy 
Another characteristic of the High Qing was rising literacy rates, not only among men, but women as well. Because men left the home more frequently during this era due to the commercialization of the trade industry, there was this conception that in order for the males for the family to succeed outside the home, women of the house needed to possess their own distinct morals and authority. This meant that the most ideal mothers of elite families would be educated as well as their husbands, in reading and writing. The main purpose for this was to start teaching their sons to read and write as young as possible to better prepare them for the civil service examinations in their intended futures. The emphasis on women's education is a major change from that of previous eras, which further distinguishes the High Qing from that of other eras, and empires.

See also 
 Chinese expansionism
 Golden ages of China
 Pax Sinica
 Tributary system of China

References 

Qing dynasty
18th century in China
Kangxi Emperor
Qianlong Emperor